Lingnan (Vietnamese: Lĩnh Nam) is a geographic area referring to the lands in the south of the Nanling Mountains. The region covers the modern Chinese subdivisions of Guangdong, Guangxi, Hainan, Hong Kong, and Macau.

Background 
The area was inhabited by the Baiyue and was the base of the ancient kingdom of Nanyue. At that time, Lingnan was considered by the ancient Chinese court to be a tropical barbarian land that had lost contact with the Zhongyuan, which was the cultural cradle of Chinese culture.

In the second century BCE, the Han conquest of Nanyue led to its absorption into the Han dynasty during its southward expansion, and its development was boosted once the Mei Pass was paved. The region was also the base of the Kingdom of Southern Han (917-971).

Lingnan Jiedushi
Lingnan Jiedushi or military command, were ruled by military governors during the Tang dynasty. 

List of jiedushis: 
Song Jing 716
Zhen Dan 717
Pei Zhouxian 719-722
Li Ju 727-735
Li Shangyin 727
Li Chaoyin 733-735
Song Ding 739
Pei Dunfu 745
Peng Guo 745-747
Lu Huan 749-751
Zhang Jiugao 751-753
A Lüguang 754-756
Helan Jinming 756
Wei Lijian 757-758
Zhang Wanqing 758-760
Zhao Liangbi 760-761
Zhang Xiu 763
Yang Shenwei 764-767
Xu Hao 767-768
Li Mian 768-772
Li Chongben 772-773
Lu Sigong 773
Li Shu 775
Gao Yun 776-777
Zhang Boyi 777-782
Yuan Xiu 782-784
Du You 784-787
Li Fu 787-792
Xue Jue 792-795
Wang E 795-801
Zhao Zhi 801-802
Xu Shen 802-806
Zhao Chang 806-808
Yang Yuling 808-810
Zheng Yin 810-813
Ma Zong 813-816
Cui Yong 817
Kong Kui 817-820
Cui Neng 820-823
Zheng Quan 823-824
Cui Zhi 824-826
Hu Zheng 826-828
Li Xian 828-829
Cui Hu 829-830
Li Liang 831-833
Cui Gong 833
Wang Maoyuan 833-835
Li Congyi 835-836
Lu Jun 836-840
Cui Guicong 844-845
Lu Zhen 845-846
Li Pin 847-848
Li Xingxiu 848-849
Wei Zhengguan 849-851
Ge Ganzhong 851-854
Wei Shu 855-858
Yang Fa 858
Li Sui 858
Li Chengxun 858-859
Xiao Fang 859-860
Wei Zhou 861-868
Zheng Yu 868-871
Zheng Congdang 871-874
Wei He 874-876
Li Tiao 877-879
Zheng Xu 879-886
Lü Yongzhi 886
Pei Qu 887-889
Li Chonggui 890-895
Chen Pei 893
Cui Yin 896
Li Zhirou 896-900
Cui Yin 900
Xu Yanruo 900-901
Liu Yin 901-911
Pei Shu 903
Cui Yuan 904
Liu Yan 911-917

See also 
 Lingnan culture
 Liangguang
 Tĩnh Hải quân

References 

Regions of China
Regions of Vietnam